Jørres Schelderup Hansen (13 April 1811 - 21 December 1870) was a Norwegian politician.

He was elected to the Norwegian Parliament in 1857, representing the constituency of Tromsø og Finmarkens Amt. He worked as a vicar (sogneprest) there. He was re-elected for a second term in 1862.

References

1811 births
1870 deaths
Members of the Storting
Finnmark politicians
Norwegian priest-politicians